Acinetosporaceae is a family of brown algae in the order Ectocarpales. 

It includes eight genera:

References

Ectocarpales
Brown algae families